MDR Fernsehen is a regional public service television channel owned and operated by Mitteldeutscher Rundfunk (MDR) and serving Saxony, Saxony-Anhalt and Thuringia. It is one of the seven regional "third programmes" that are offered within the federal ARD network.

Logos

References

External links

 

Mitteldeutscher Rundfunk
ARD (broadcaster)
Television stations in Germany
Television channels and stations established in 1992
1992 establishments in Germany
Mass media in Leipzig
Mass media in Dresden
Mass media in Magdeburg
Mass media in Erfurt
German-language television stations